Zendoone Del (Heart's Prison) is the debut album by Iranian singer-songwriter Fereydoon Forooghi. It was released in 1972 as an unofficial album by Taraneh Records in Iran and includes 13 tracks. After released filmscores for Adamak, he resumed his activities in the field of film and theater music. This time, he sang a song by Farshid Ramzi, which resulted in pieces such as "Zendoone Del" and "Ghame Tanhaei".

Release
The album was released as an LP record with the sides containing six and seven songs, respectively. Before the album was released, the single "Zendoone Del" was sold as a 7-inch 45-rpm record, with "تم زندون دل" on the B-side by Juliet and manufactured by Royal. The album was re-released in 1992 by Taraneh Records.

Track listing

Personnel
 Manouchehr Cheshmazar – piano

References

External links

1992 albums
Persian-language albums